Zeuthen may refer to:

Zeuthen, a town in Brandenburg, Germany
Else Zeuthen, Danish pacifist and politician
Hieronymus Georg Zeuthen, Danish mathematician
Zeuthen Strategy in Game theory (named for Frederik Zeuthen)